Sara Helena Åberg (born 16 July 1971) is a former Swedish Olympic freestyle swimmer. She competed in the 1988 Summer Olympics, where she swam the 50-metre freestyle, finishing 23rd. Åberg also represented Sweden at the European Championships - winning a silver in relay - and the World Championships, winning a bronze medal in relay.
At the Helsingborgs Simsällskaps 100 years jubilée in 2007, Åberg was awarded the swimmer of the century.

Åberg has lived openly gay since the end of 1980's. She had to go back into the closet for her time studying at the university in Georgia, where she felt "one was absolutely not allowed to be gay" at the time.

Åberg is the aunt of the Swedish Youth Olympics swimmer Gustav Åberg Lejdström.

See also
 Helsingborgs SS
 List of University of Georgia people

References

1971 births
Living people
Georgia Bulldogs women's swimmers
Helsingborgs SS swimmers
Olympic swimmers of Sweden
Swimmers at the 1988 Summer Olympics
Swedish LGBT sportspeople
LGBT swimmers
Lesbian sportswomen
Swedish female freestyle swimmers